Eugene Nicholas Fodor, Jr. (March 5, 1950 – February 26, 2011) was an American classical violinist.

Fodor was born in Denver, Colorado. His first 10 years of study were with Harold Wippler, who taught him from 1958 until 1968. Wippler observed  that "It was very apparent that he had exceptional talent. Not just technical talent but a great, unusual understanding of music." He then studied at the Juilliard School in New York City, Indiana University Bloomington and the University of Southern California, where his teachers included Ivan Galamian, Josef Gingold and Jascha Heifetz, respectively.

Fodor made his solo debut with the Denver Symphony Orchestra at the age of 10, playing Max Bruch's Violin Concerto No. 1, and began touring as a soloist while still a young teenager.

Fodor won numerous national contests before the age of 17, including First Prize in both the Merriweather Post Competition in Washington, D.C., and the Young Musicians Foundation Competition in Los Angeles.

He went on to win first prize in the Paganini Competition in Italy in 1972, at the age of 22. It was this win that gained him widespread public attention. He achieved the highest prize awarded (second prize, shared with two other violinists since first prize was not awarded that year) in the International Tchaikovsky Competition in 1974 in Moscow, Russia. This award raised his profile further, as an American sharing the top Soviet prize during the height of the Cold War. He signed a recording contract with RCA Red Seal and was a frequent guest on The Tonight Show Starring Johnny Carson. Fodor was also awarded the European Soloist award "Prix Europeen du Soliste" in January 1999.

Fodor appeared on the television show SCTV on 20 November 1981 in a parody of the Joan Crawford movie Humoresque called New York Rhapsody.

His career declined in the 1980s. An arrest for drug possession on Martha's Vineyard in 1989 resulted in negative publicity. Though he continued concertizing until shortly before his death and made recordings through the 2000s, high-profile appearances such as he had made in the years following his Moscow win became a thing of the past. After years of battling alcohol and drug addiction, Fodor died from cirrhosis in Arlington County, Virginia, on February 26, 2011, at the age of 60.  His first marriage was to Susan Davis in 1978. They divorced in 1986.  His second marriage to Sally Swedlund, whom he married in 1996, also ended in divorce in 2009.  He remarried Ms. Davis in November 2010.  He and Susan had three children and two grandchildren.

Selected discography 
 Tchaikovsky Violin Concerto No. 1 in D major, Opus 35, with the New Philharmonia Orchestra and Erich Leinsdorf  (1974, RCA Red Seal ARL1-0781)
 Saint-Saëns Introduction and Rondo Capriccioso, Opus 28, with the New Philharmonia Orchestra and Erich Leinsdorf (1974, RCA Red Seal ARL1-0781)
 Bach Violin Concertos 
 Nielsen Violin Concerto (2001, Grazioso Records 72601)
 Lalo: Symphonie espagnole / Sibelius: Violin Concerto (2000, Grazioso Records 61501)
 Brahms: Complete Sonatas for Violin & Piano (1996, Clarity Records 1014)
 Concertos of Brahms, Sibelius and the first two concertos of Paganini with the Kiev Philharmonic
 Love Fodor Style (2002, Grazioso Records 95143)
 Instrument of the Angels (2001, Grazioso Records 81904, famous gospel pieces)

References

American classical violinists
Male classical violinists
American male violinists
Musicians from Denver
1950 births
2011 deaths
Paganini Competition prize-winners
20th-century classical violinists
20th-century American male musicians
20th-century American violinists